The 1976–77 Cincinnati Stingers season was the Stingers' second season of operation in the World Hockey Association (WHA).

Offseason

Regular season

Final standings

Game log

Playoffs

Indianapolis Racers 4, Cincinnati Stingers 0 – Division Semifinals

Player stats

Awards and records

Transactions

Draft picks
Cincinnati's draft picks at the 1976 WHA Amateur Draft.

Farm teams

See also
1976–77 WHA season

References

External links

Cincinnati Stingers seasons
Cinc
Cinc